Jeremiah Brent (born Jeremy Clevenger Johnson; November 24, 1984) is an American interior designer and television personality. He founded his design firm Jeremiah Brent Design (JBD) in 2011, a full service interior design firm based in Los Angeles and New York City. He stars in the 2017 TLC series Nate & Jeremiah by Design (2017) and as the event designer in the Netflix reality series Say I Do (2020).

Early life and education 
The son of Gwen A. Johnson and Terry Johnson, Brent was born and raised in Modesto, California. Growing up, his father was a deputy sheriff in Modesto and his mother was a paralegal in San Francisco. Brent graduated from Modesto High School in 2002, where he went by the name Jeremy Johnson. While at Modesto High, Brent was active in drama, speech and debate. In 2004 at the age of 19, he moved to Los Angeles. Brent spent his first year living on friends' couches and in his Jeep. His first apartment was across the street from Covenant House, a shelter for homeless teens, which he later helped redesign.

Career 
Jeremiah Brent is an actor and producer, known for The Ode (2008), Nate & Jeremiah by Design (2017), The Nate & Jeremiah Home Project (2021), The Rachel Zoe Project (2011), Say I Do (2020) and Home Made Simple (2015). In early 2014, Brent and Nate Berkus were featured in clothier Banana Republic's "True Outfitters" ads in InStyle and Rolling Stone, among other magazines. The New York Times noted they were the first same-sex couple to be featured in ads for the magazines.  Their Manhattan apartment was featured in the September 2015 issue of Architectural Digest magazine, where Jeremiah Brent and Nate Berkus appeared on the cover with their daughter Poppy.

Brent was featured in many television shows with a big break in 2011 when he became a styling associate to Rachel Zoe on her syndicated show The Rachel Zoe Project in the fourth season of the show. He has also appeared in covers of various publications such as Domino magazine, Architectural Digest, Harper's Bazaar and People magazine. He was host of the Emmy Award-winning show Home Made Simple, broadcast for two seasons on Oprah Winfrey's OWN network. Alongside his husband, fellow interior designer Nate Berkus, he launched in 2017 the TV show Nate & Jeremiah by Design broadcast on TLC network.[2] In 2017, he also became part of Living Spaces particularly Living Spaces presents Behind the Design.

In 2020, Brent began starring as the design expert on Netflix's reality show Say I Do - a wedding version of hit show Queer Eye.

Personal life
After one year of dating, he became engaged to fellow interior designer and television personality Nate Berkus in April 2013. They were married on May 4, 2014 in Manhattan. The couple's Jewish–Buddhist ceremony was officiated by the then-president of the Oprah Winfrey Network, Sheri Salata. 

Brent's daughter, Poppy Brent-Berkus, was born on March 23, 2015 and their son, Oskar Michael Brent-Berkus, followed on March 26, 2018. Both children were born by different egg donors and surrogates contracted through Growing Generations, and neither Brent nor Berkus have publicly disclosed who the biological parents of their children are. 

In December 2018, Brent and Berkus listed their 8,500-square-foot Los Angeles home where they had planned to “put down roots” for $13.8 million. The 1920s Mediterranean-style home that the couple remodeled over a two-year period sold for $11.35 million. In 2019, they moved back to Manhattan.

References

External links
Official website
Jeremiah Brent Design
 

Living people
1984 births
American interior designers
American LGBT artists
American LGBT broadcasters
American LGBT entertainers
American television personalities
LGBT designers
LGBT people from California
People from Modesto, California